Epicauta pensylvanica, known generally as the black blister beetle or black aster bug, is a species of burning blister beetle in the family Meloidae.

The species name is sometimes spelled with a double "n", "Epicauta pennsylvanica".

References

Further reading

External links

 

Tenebrionoidea
Beetles described in 1775
Taxa named by Charles De Geer